The Australian Commission for Law Enforcement Integrity (ACLEI) is an Australian government statutory agency, created under the Law Enforcement Integrity Commissioner Act 2006. Its role is to support the Law Enforcement Integrity Commissioner, detecting and preventing corruption in the Australian Criminal Intelligence Commission, the Department of Home Affairs (Australia) including the Australian Border Force (ABF), the Australian Federal Police, Australian Transaction Reports and Analysis Centre (AUSTRAC) and aspects of the Department of Agriculture and Water Resources.

The minister responsible for the agency is Mark Dreyfus, Attorney-General.  ACLEI is headed by an Integrity Commissioner.

Functions
Priority is given to investigations of serious and systemic corruption.  ACLEI supports the Integrity Commissioner by collecting intelligence regarding corruption. The Integrity Commissioner is required to make recommendation to the federal government regarding improvements to legislation that will prevent corrupt practices or their early detection.  Its role is far more limited than proposals for a National Anti-Corruption Commission.

See also 

 Law enforcement in Australia

References

External links 
 
 Law Enforcement Integrity Commissioner Act 2006

Australian law government bodies
Police oversight organizations
Government agencies established in 2006
2006 establishments in Australia